The 1889 Dover Conference Academy Athletic Club football team represented Dover Conference Academy in the 1889 college football season as an independent. Results may be incomplete, but Dover played in at least three games, compiling a 0–2–1 record.

Schedule

References

Dover Conference Academy
Wesley Wolverines football seasons
College football winless seasons
Dover Conference Academy Athletic Club football